LSR J1835+3259 is a nearby ultracool dwarf of spectral class M8.5, located in constellation Lyra, the discovery of which was published in 2003. Previously it was concluded that this star is a young brown dwarf, but no lithium absorption lines are detected for this object, which is a strong indicator for young brown dwarfs that need 10-100 million years to deplete lithium.

Distance
Trigonometric parallax of this object, measured in 2001–2002 with the USNO 61 inch (1.5 m) reflector under US Naval Observatory (USNO) parallax program, is 0.1765 ± 0.0005 arcsec, corresponding to a distance of 5.67 ± 0.02 pc, or 18.48 ± 0.05 ly.

Characteristics 
The first potential extrasolar auroras detected occurred in the atmosphere of LSR J1835+3259. They were found in July 2015 by the Karl G. Jansky Very Large Array in New Mexico by analyzing the emitted radio waves. The potential auroras were probably 1 million times brighter than those ever observed on Earth. The optical emission is mainly red in colour, because the charged particles are interacting with hydrogen in its atmosphere. It is not known what the cause is. Some have speculated that material may be being stripped off the surface of the brown dwarf via stellar winds to produce its own electrons. Another possible explanation is an as-yet-undetected planet or moon around the dwarf, which is throwing off material to light it up, as is the case with Jupiter and its moon Io.

References

 Table with parallaxes.

External links
The 100 Nearest Star Systems (RECONS)

M-type main-sequence stars
Lyra (constellation)
J18353790+3259545